IRTC may refer to:
 Integrated Rural Technology Centre, a research center in Mundur, Palakkad, Kerala, India
 Incheon Rapid Transit Corporation